Home Alone 3 is a 1997 American family comedy film directed by Raja Gosnell in his directorial debut, written and co-produced by John Hughes, and starring Alex D. Linz and Haviland Morris. The film tells the story of an 8-year-old boy who defends his home from a dangerous band of international criminals working for a terrorist organization. It is the third film in the Home Alone franchise, and the first not to feature actor Macaulay Culkin, director Chris Columbus, or composer John Williams. It is also the final film in the Home Alone franchise to receive a theatrical release.

The film was met with mixed reviews, with critics praising Linz's performance but criticizing the film's departure from the previous installments, including its themes and cast. Home Alone 3 was followed by a made-for-television sequel, Home Alone 4, in 2002.

Plot

Peter Beaupre, Alice Ribbons, Burton Jernigan, and Earl Unger are four internationally wanted criminals who work for a terrorist organization. In Silicon Valley, California, they steal a $10 million missile-cloaking microchip and hide it inside a remote control toy car to sneak it past security at San Francisco International Airport. However, a luggage mix-up causes a Chicago-bound elderly passenger named Mrs. Hess to inadvertently take the thieves' bag containing the car. The four thieves arrive in Chicago and systematically search every house in Mrs. Hess's suburban neighborhood to find the chip.

Eight-year-old Alex Pruitt is given the remote control car by Mrs. Hess for shoveling her driveway. He returns home and discovers that he has chickenpox and must stay out of school. The next day, Alex discovers the thieves while spying on his neighbors. After two failed attempts to have them apprehended, Alex attaches a camera to the remote control car and uses it to spy on them, leading to the thieves chasing it when they spot it. Wondering what they want with the toy car, Alex opens it and discovers the stolen chip. He informs the local U.S. Air Force Recruitment Center about the discovery and asks if they can forward the information about the chip to the right authorities.

The thieves finally deduce that Alex has been watching them and decide to break into his house. Alex rigs the house with booby traps with help from his pet rat Doris and his brother's loud-mouthed parrot. Beaupre, Alice, Jernigan and Unger break in, spring the traps, and suffer various injuries. While the four pursue Alex around the house, he flees and rescues Mrs. Hess, who has been duct taped to a chair in her garage by Alice. Beaupre ambushes Alex, but the latter uses a bubble gun resembling a Glock to scare him off.

Meanwhile, FBI agents and Chicago PD officers arrive at Alex's siblings' school after a tipoff from the recruitment center. Alex's family brings the agents and the police to their house, where they arrest Alice, Jernigan, and Unger. However, Beaupre hides in the snow fort in the backyard. The parrot drives the remote control car into the fort and threatens to light fireworks, which are lined around the inside. Beaupre offers a cracker in exchange for silence, but the parrot demands two. Since Beaupre has only one, the parrot then lights the fireworks and flees. Beaupre is discovered and arrested.

Later, the Pruitts, Hess, and the authorities hold a celebration for Alex as the Pruitt house is being repaired, with Jack returning home from a business trip. Later, Beaupre's group are shown to have contracted Alex's chickenpox during their mugshots.

Cast

Production

Home Alone 3 was pitched at the same time as Home Alone 2: Lost in New York, and both films were meant to be produced simultaneously; however, those plans fell through. The idea for a third Home Alone movie was revived in the mid-1990s; early drafts called for Macaulay Culkin to reprise the role of teenage Kevin McCallister. However, by 1994, Culkin was no longer acting. As a result, the idea was reworked, centering on a new cast of characters.

It was filmed in Chicago and Evanston, Illinois, with the airport scenes in the beginning of the film being shot at two different concourses at O'Hare International Airport.

Principal photography began on December 2, 1996, and filming concluded on March 22, 1997.

Fox Family Films was the division of 20th Century Fox responsible for the production on the film.

Music

Release

Home media

Home Alone 3 was released on VHS and Laserdisc on June 2, 1998, and on DVD on November 3, 1998, which was later reissued in December 2007 (and, as part of Home Alone multi-packs, in 2006 and 2008). While the DVD presents the film in its original Widescreen format (1.85:1), it is presented in a non-anamorphic 4:3 matte.

Reception

Box office
The film grossed $79,082,515 worldwide.

Critical response
The site's critical consensus reads: "Macaulay Culkin's precocious charisma is sorely missed in this hollow sequel, which doubles down on the broad comedy while lacking all the hallmarks that made the original a classic." Audiences polled by CinemaScore gave the film an average grade of "B+" on an A+ to F scale.

Roger Ebert of the Chicago Sun-Times gave the film 3 out of 4 stars and said that he found it to be "fresh, very funny, and better than the first two."

Accolades
The film was nominated for a Golden Raspberry Award for Worst Remake or Sequel, losing to Speed 2: Cruise Control.

Novelization
A novelization based on the screenplay was written by Todd Strasser and published by Scholastic in 1997 to coincide with the film.

References

External links

 
 

Home Alone (franchise)
1997 films
1997 comedy films
1997 directorial debut films
1990s American films
1990s comedy films
1990s crime comedy films
1990s English-language films
1990s spy comedy films
20th Century Fox films
American comedy films
American crime comedy films
American sequel films
American spy comedy films
Films about the Federal Bureau of Investigation
Films about terrorism
Films directed by Raja Gosnell
Films produced by John Hughes (filmmaker)
Films scored by Nick Glennie-Smith
Films set in Chicago
Films shot in Chicago
Films with screenplays by John Hughes (filmmaker)
Home invasions in film
North Korea in fiction